Phyciodes batesii, the tawny crescent, is a butterfly of the family Nymphalidae that occurs in North America.

Description
The upperside is dark brown with orange and the forewing has a pale postmedian band with submarginal bands. The female's black submarginal band has dots. Both sexes have black and white antenna knobs. The wingspan is from 25 to 38 mm.

Life cycle
Adults fly once a year between May and July. There is sometimes a partial second brood in Michigan. During this time the females lay their eggs in groups on the host plants. The third-instar caterpillars hibernate.

Larval foods

 Aster undulatus

Adult foods

 Flower nectar

Similar species
Phyciodes cocyta – northern crescent
Phyciodes tharos – pearl crescent

References

"Phyciodes Hübner, [1819]" at Markku Savela's Lepidoptera and Some Other Life Forms

Butterflies of North America
Melitaeini
Taxa named by Tryon Reakirt
Butterflies described in 1865